Jung Jin-ho may refer to:

Jung Jin-ho (handballer)
Jung Jin-ho (baseball)
Jeong Jin-ho, footballer